Engine House No. 6 is a historic fire station located at Baltimore, Maryland, United States. This two-story brick building features a 103-foot Italian-Gothic tower at the apex of its truncated triangular shape. It was built in 1853–54, and the tower is said to be a copy of Giotto's campanile in Florence, Italy.

Engine House No. 6 was listed on the National Register of Historic Places in 1973.

See also
Fire departments in Maryland
Engine House No. 8 (Baltimore, Maryland)
Paca Street Firehouse
Poppleton Fire Station

References

External links
, including undated photo, at Maryland Historical Trust
Explore Baltimore Heritage - Engine House No. 6

East Baltimore
Fire stations completed in 1854
Towers completed in 1854
Fire stations on the National Register of Historic Places in Maryland
Government buildings on the National Register of Historic Places in Baltimore
Italianate architecture in Maryland
Historic American Buildings Survey in Baltimore
1854 establishments in Maryland
Baltimore City Landmarks